Pristidia is a genus of Asian sac spiders first described by Christa L. Deeleman-Reinhold in 2001.

Species
 it contains six species:
Pristidia cervicornuta Yu, Zhang & Chen, 2017 – China
Pristidia longistila Deeleman-Reinhold, 2001 – Borneo
Pristidia prima Deeleman-Reinhold, 2001 (type) – Thailand, Malaysia, Indonesia (Sumatra, Java)
Pristidia ramosa Yu, Sun & Zhang, 2012 – China, Taiwan
Pristidia secunda Deeleman-Reinhold, 2001 – Indonesia (Sumatra)
Pristidia viridissima Deeleman-Reinhold, 2001 – Thailand to Indonesia (Borneo)

References

Araneomorphae genera
Clubionidae
Spiders of Asia